Edward Heathcote (April 15, 1859 – January 17, 1944) was a member of the Wisconsin State Assembly.

Biography
Heathcote was born on April 15, 1859 in Monterey, Wisconsin. He later moved to the Town of Fennimore, Wisconsin.

Career
Heathcote was elected to the Assembly in 1914, where he served on the finance committee. Additionally, he was Chairman of Fennimore and a member of the Fennimore Town Board. He was a Republican.

References

External links
 

People from Oconomowoc, Wisconsin
People from Fennimore, Wisconsin
Mayors of places in Wisconsin
Wisconsin city council members
Republican Party members of the Wisconsin State Assembly
1859 births
1944 deaths